Crassignatha is a genus of Asian dwarf orb-weavers that was first described by J. Wunderlich in 1995.

Species
 it contains twenty-eight species, found in Asia:
Crassignatha baihua Lin & S. Q. Li, 2020 – China
Crassignatha bangbie Lin & S. Q. Li, 2020 – China
Crassignatha bicorniventris (Lin & Li, 2009) – China
Crassignatha changyan Lin & S. Q. Li, 2020 – China
Crassignatha danaugirangensis Miller et al., 2014 – Borneo
Crassignatha dongnai Lin & S. Q. Li, 2020 – Vietnam
Crassignatha ertou Miller, Griswold & Yin, 2009 – China
Crassignatha gucheng Lin & S. Q. Li, 2020 – China
Crassignatha gudu Miller, Griswold & Yin, 2009 – China
Crassignatha haeneli Wunderlich, 1995 (type) – Malaysia
Crassignatha longtou Miller, Griswold & Yin, 2009 – China
Crassignatha mengla Lin & S. Q. Li, 2020 – China
Crassignatha nantou Lin & S. Q. Li, 2020 – Taiwan
Crassignatha nasalis Lin & S. Q. Li, 2020 – China
Crassignatha pianma Miller, Griswold & Yin, 2009 – China
Crassignatha quadriventris Lin & Li, 2009 – China
Crassignatha quanqu Miller, Griswold & Yin, 2009 – China
Crassignatha rostriformis Lin & S. Q. Li, 2020 – China
Crassignatha seedam Rivera-Quiroz, Petcharad & Miller, 2021 – Thailand
Crassignatha seeliam Rivera-Quiroz, Petcharad & Miller, 2021 – Thailand
Crassignatha shiluensis Lin & Li, 2009 – China, Laos, Thailand
Crassignatha shunani Lin & S. Q. Li, 2020 – China
Crassignatha si Lin & S. Q. Li, 2020 – China
Crassignatha spinathoraxi Lin & S. Q. Li, 2020 – China
Crassignatha thampra Lin & S. Q. Li, 2020 – Thailand
Crassignatha xichou Lin & S. Q. Li, 2020 – China
Crassignatha yamu Miller, Griswold & Yin, 2009 – China
Crassignatha yinzhi Miller, Griswold & Yin, 2009 – China

See also
 List of Symphytognathidae species

References

Araneomorphae genera
Spiders of Asia
Symphytognathidae